William Henry Macleod Read (7 February 1819 – 10 May 1909) was an active participant in the commercial, political and social life of Singapore and the Malay states between 1841 and 1887.

Early life
Read was born in Scotland, the son of Christopher Rideout Read, co-partner of A. L. Johnston & Company. Aged 22, he travelled to Singapore to take his father's place at A. L. Johnston & Company, Singapore's leading merchant company at that time, his father retiring and returning to England the following year (1842). Alexander Laurie Johnston, his father's co-partner, retired and left Singapore in December. Read headed the company until his own retirement in 1887. Read was predeceased by his wife, Marjory Cumming-Read at age 21 on 24 June 1849. Cumming-Read was the daughter of banker John Cumming of Forres, Scotland and there is a stone marker in her memory as his "beloved and lamented wife" at St Andrew's Cathedral, Singapore.

Contributions to early colonial Singapore
William Read was appointed Special Constable to deal with ethnic riots between the Colony's Hokkien and Cantonese communities in 1854. He is credited with using his powers of negotiation and mediation to settle the conflict. Also in 1854, William Read was the first volunteer of the Singapore Rifle Corps, a militia unit in which he remained active for 25 years.

In 1857 Read, who was fluent in French, was made Counsul for the Netherlands in Singapore, a post he held until 1885. For his service as the Dutch Counsul, he was awarded the Order of the Netherlands Lion (Knight Commander). By 1865, Read was Chairman of the Singapore Chamber of Commerce. During his tenure in the then British Straits Settlement, Singapore passed from control of British India to the British Colonial Office in 1867. William Read was a member of the Legislative Council that oversaw the transfer. In 1868, Read was appointed Companion of the Order of St. Michael & St. George (C.M.G.), by Queen Victoria. An announcement in the London Gazette noted, Chancery of the Order of Saint Michael and Saint George, Downing Street, February 3, 1885. THE Queen has been graciously pleased to give directions for the following appointment to the Most Distinguished Order of Saint Michael and Saint George : To be an Ordinary Member of the Third Class, of Companions of the said Most Distinguished Order :— William Henry Macleod Read, Esq., for long and valuable services rendered in the Straits Settlements. Read had ongoing involvements in regional politics, including the establishment of the  British Colonial presence in Borneo through co-chairmanship of the British North Borneo Provisional Association in 1881. The charter of the British North Borneo Company, lists merchant William Henry Macleod Read, of 25 Durham Terrace, in the Country of Middlesex, as one of its petitioners.

On 23 February 1843 Read, an avid horseman, won the first prize in the inaugural Singapore Cup, Singapore's first horse derby. In March of that year, he organised the Colony's first rowing regatta. The Singapore Turf Club, the island's home of horse racing, began as Read's Singapore Sporting Club on 4 October 1842.  His interest in educational and cultural life are evidenced by his involvement with the National Library (first treasurer), trusteeship of Singapore (later Raffles) Institution, and founding of the first Sailor's Home (appointed Honorary Secretary).

Read was also active as a Freemason, being the second person to be initiated to the Masonic Lodge Zetland in the East and soon becoming its Worshipful Master. He eventually rose to become leader of the Freemasons' Eastern Archipelago, District Grand Lodge. He officiated over Masonic ceremonies which included the laying of the Foundation Stone of Raffles Lighthouse in 1854. One of Read's last duties as a Singapore resident was laying the first cylinder of a bridge over the Singapore River – a bridge that today still bears his name, Read Bridge.

Municipal assessment funds
In January 1845, at a public meeting, Read put forward a motion proposing that municipal assessment funds (see Act XIII of 1839 allowing for an assessment fund to be used for municipal purposes) be controlled by one person appointed by government and two persons appointed by ratepayers. The motion was carried by a large majority. However a new bill was passed (Act IX of 1848 that provided for two officials and three non-officials, all nominated by the Governor to administer the funds.

Legislative Council of the Straits Settlements
Read was made a member of the Legislative Council of the Straits Settlements by Royal appointment. A notice in the London Gazette, reads,Downing Street, May 18, 1882. THE Queen has been pleased to appoint George Macfarlane Sandilands, Esq., and William Henry Macleod Read, Esq., to be Members of the Legislative Council of the Straits Settlements.

and again

"Downing Street, March 17, 1868. The Queen has been pleased to appoint William Henry Macleod Read, Forbes Scott Brown, Thomas Scott, and Robert Little, Esqrs., to be Members of. the Legislative Council of the Straits Settlements ; and William Bagnell, Alfred James Harrigan,. and Henry Stephens Harrigan, Esqrs., to be Members of the Legislative Council of the Virgin Islands."

Freemasons
On 27 September 1878 a land grant was issued in favour of R. W. Bro. William Henry Macleod Read, District Grand Master, and his successors in office for the use of Masons under the United Grand Lodge of Antient, Free and Accepted Masons of England. Read laid the foundation stone for the new building on 14 April 1879. The new hall was consecrated on 27 December 1879 by the District Grand Master, Read, Thomas Cargill, the civil engineer who designed the building, was installed as Master of Lodge Zetland-in-the-East. Read was eventually succeeded in his role as District Grand Master by Major Samuel Dunlop in 1885.

The Singapore Turf Club
The Singapore Turf Club, formerly known as the Singapore Sporting Club, was founded by Read on 4 October 1842. Marking the 24th anniversary of the founding of Singapore by Sir Stamford Raffles, the first races were held on 23 and 25 February 1843. Read himself won the first Derby, called the Singapore Cup, and took home the prize money of $150.

Return from the Colonies
Read returned to Britain in February 1887. He had spent almost 46 years in Singapore. In 1901, Read published his memoirs "Play and Politics, Recollections of Malaya by an Old Resident". Read died on 10 May 1909, aged 91. In 1910, the Governor of Singapore unveiled a memorial tablet to the memory of William Henry Macleod Read in St. Andrew's Cathedral, Singapore, for his outstanding contributions to Singapore. This tablet dedication can be still seen on the left side, behind the main entrance door of the church. Read's imprint on the Straits Settlements also survived his passing through descendants in the local Eurasian community bearing his Read surname. Read was buried on 13 May 1909 at Brompton Cemetery, London.

See also
 Tan Kim Ching
 Chung Keng Quee
 Klang War
 Larut War

References
 Play and politics recollections of Malaya by an old resident. (1901). London: W.Gardner Darton (Call no.: RRARE 959 503 REA)
 Buckley, C. B. (1984). An anecdotal history of old times in Singapore: 1819–1867 (pp. 135, 367–369). Singapore: Oxford University Press.
(Call no.: RSING 959.57 BUC)
 Edwards, N. & Keys, P. (1988). Singapore: A guide to buildings, streets, places (p. 506). Singapore: Times Books International.
(Call no.: RSING 959.57 EDW)
 Freemasons. (1873). Ceremony of layaing the foundation stone of the Clyde Terrace Market, at Singapore, the 29th day of March 1873, by the Rt. Worshipful, the District Grand Master, W. H. Read [Microfilm: NL 5876]. Singapore: Straits Times Press.
(Call no.: RSEA 959.51 FRE)
 Turnbull, C. M. (1995). Dateline Singapore: 150 years of the Straits Times (pp. 22–35, 45–46). Singapore: Times Editions: Singapore Press Holdings
(Call no.: RSING 079.5957 TUR)
 Turnbull, C. M. (1972). The Straits Settlements 1826–1867: Indian presidency to crown colony (pp. 24–25, 321–322). London: Athlone Press
(Call no.: RCLOS 959.57 TUR)
 Tyers, R. K. (1993). Ray Tyers' Singapore: Then and now (p. 26). Singapore: Landmark Books.
(Call no.: RSING 959.57 TYE)

Online links

British colonial police officers
1819 births
1909 deaths
People from British Malaya
People from British Singapore
Burials at Brompton Cemetery